BASIC Programming is an Atari Video Computer System (later called the Atari 2600) cartridge that teaches simple computer programming using a dialect of BASIC. Written by Warren Robinett and released by Atari, Inc. in 1979, this BASIC interpreter is one of a few non-game cartridges for the console. The Atari VCS's RAM size of 128 bytes restricts the possibilities for writing programs.

Details

The BASIC Programming display is divided into six regions:

 Program is where instructions are typed. It has a maximum of eleven lines of code.
 Stack shows temporary results of what the program does. 
 Variables stores the values of any variables that the program is using. 
 Output displays any output values that the program creates. 
 Status shows the amount of available memory remaining.
 Graphics contains two colored squares that can be manipulated by the program.

Input is given through two Atari keypad controllers, which came with special overlays to show how to type the different commands and letters.  Programs are restricted to 64 characters in size and normally 9 lines of code, limiting the programs that can be written (users can disable all windows except Program and keep selecting "New Line" until 11 lines of code are present).

Language features

VCS BASIC supports the following keywords:
 Statements: Print
 Structure: Goto, If-Then-Else
 Graphics: Clear
 Functions: Hit, Key
 Math: + - × ÷ Mod
 Relational operators: < > =

Unlike most BASIC implementations of the time:
 VCS BASIC uses ← instead of = for assignment; e.g., A←A+1.
 Statements can be strung together on a line without a delimiter; e.g., Note←APrintA.
 An If statement can be used as a function, returning a value: Mod292
 If statements can take an Else clause.

Special variable names:
 Note sounds a musical note, assigned numbers from 0 to 7
 Numbers assigned to Note are implicitly assigned modulus 8, thus 8 becomes 0, 9 becomes 1, etc.
 Hor1, Hor2 - the horizontal coordinate of one of two squares
 Ver1, Ver2 - the vertical coordinate of one of two squares

The language supports 26 unsigned integer variables A to Z. VCS BASIC supports integers from 0 to 99. Math operations wrap, so 99+1 becomes 0, 99+2 becomes 1, etc.

Sample code
The following example of a Pong game is provided.

See also

List of Atari 2600 games
 Spectravideo CompuMate
 Family BASIC

References

External links
 BASIC Programming at Atari Mania
 

1979 software
Atari 2600
BASIC interpreters
BASIC programming language family
Discontinued BASICs
Video game development software